Hippolyte Girardot (born Frédéric Girardot; 10 October 1955) is a French actor, film director and screenwriter. He is the father of actress Ana Girardot.

Selected filmography
 1973: La Femme de Jean, directed by Yannick Bellon, Rémi
 1980: Inspecteur la Bavure, directed by Claude Zidi, a friend of Michel Clément
 1980: L'Amour nu, directed by Yannick Bellon, Hervé
 1982: Le Destin de Juliette, directed by Aline Issermann, Pierre
 1984: Le Bon Plaisir, directed by Francis Girod, Pierre
 1984: Prénom Carmen (First Name: Carmen), directed by Jean-Luc Godard, Fred
 1984: Fort Saganne, directed by Alain Corneau, Dr Courette
 1985: L'Amour ou presque, directed by Patrice Gautier, Luc
 1986: Manon des Sources (Manon of the Spring), directed by Claude Berri, Bernard Olivier
 1986: L'Amant magnifique, directed by Aline Issermann, Vincent
 1986: Suivez mon regard, directed by Jean Curtelin, The reporter in Africa
 1986: Descente aux enfers, directed by Francis Girod, Philippe Devignat
 1987: Les Pyramides bleues, directed by Arielle Dombasle,  Mark
 1989: Un monde sans pitié, directed by Eric Rochant, Hippo
 1989: L'Affaire Wallraff, directed by Bobby Roth, Rudolph Schick
 1991: Hors la vie, directed by Maroun Bagdadi, Patrick Perrault
 1992: Confessions d'un Barjo, directed by Jérôme Boivin, Barjo
 1992: La Fille de l'air, directed by Maroun Bagdadi, Philippe
 1992: Après l'amour, directed by Diane Kurys, Tom
 1992: Toxic affair, directed by Philomene Esposito, Georges
 1993: Le Parfum d'Yvonne, directed by Patrice Leconte, Victor Chmara
 1993: Les Patriotes, directed by Eric Rochant, Daniel
 1994: Quand j'avais cinq ans je m'ai tué, directed by Jean-Claude Sussfeld, Dr Edouard Valmont
 1996: Le Bel été 1914, directed by Christian de Chalonge,  Pierre Mercadier
 1996: La Cible, directed by Pierre Courrège,  Stan
 1997: Vive la République !, directed by Eric Rochant, Henri
 2001: Jump Tomorrow, directed by Joel Hopkins, Gerard
 2002: Poil de Carotte à la recherche du bonheur, directed by Franck Llopis
 2002: Le Tango des Rashevski, directed by Sam Garbarski,  Antoine
 2002: Mariage et conséquences, directed by Joel Hopkins, Gérard
 2003: Nos amis les flics, directed by Bob Swaim, Fatouche
 2003: Léo en jouant « Dans la compagnie des hommes », directed by Arnaud Desplechin, William de Lille
 2003: Trois couples en quête d'orage, directed by Jacques Otmezguine, Jean-Xavier
 2003: Kings and Queen, directed by Arnaud Desplechin, Maître Marc Mamanne
 2003: Modigliani, directed by Mick Davis, Utrillo
 2004: House of 9, directed by Steven R. Monroe, Francis
 2004: La Moustache (The Moustache), directed by Emmanuel Carrère, Bruno
 2005: Incontrôlable, directed by Raffy Shart, Roger
 2005: Paris, je t'aime, directed by Olivier Assayas
 2005: Un an, directed by Laurent Boulanger, Félix
 2005: Lady Chatterley, directed by Pascale Ferran, Sir Clifford
 2006: Le Pressentiment, directed by Jean-Pierre Darroussin, Marc Bénesteau
 2006: Trahisons, directed by Janluk Penot, colonel Podorovsky
 2006: Où avais-je la tête ?, directed by Nathalie Donnini
 2006: Je pense à vous, directed by Pascal Bonitzer, Antoine
 2007: L'Invité, directed by Laurent Bouhnik
 2007: Ma place au soleil, directed by Eric de Montalier
 2007: Flight of the Red Balloon directed by Hou Hsiao-hsien, Marc
 2008: Passe-passe directed by Tonie Marshall
 2008: Caos calmo (Quiet Chaos) 2008: A Christmas Tale, directed by Arnaud Desplechin, Claude
 2008: Le crime est notre affaire, directed by Pascal Thomas
 2009: Park Benches, directed by Bruno Podalydès
 2010: Top Floor, Left Wing, directed by Angelo Cianci, François
 2011: Sleeping Sickness, directed by Ulrich Köhler, Gaspard Signac
 2011: The Conquest, directed by Xavier Durringer, Claude Guéant
 2012: You Ain't Seen Nothin' Yet!, directed by Alain Resnais
 2012: Les saveurs du Palais, directed by Christian Vincent
 2013L Kidon, directed by Emmanuel Naccache, Garnier
 2014: Life of Riley 2014: Bird People, directed by Pascale Ferran
 2014: To Life, directed by Jean-Jacques Zilbermann, Henri
 2015: Okkupert (Norwegian TV-series), Pierre Anselme
 2020: Mama Weed, directed by Jean-Paul Salomé, Philippe
 2021: The French Dispatch, directed by Wes Anderson, Chou-fleur
 2022 : Irma Vep, directed by Olivier Assayas, Robert Danjou / Jean Ayme
 2023 : Bardot'', directed by Danièle Thompson and Christopher Thompson, Louis Bardot

External links

French male film actors
1955 births
Living people
People from Boulogne-Billancourt
French film directors
French male screenwriters
French screenwriters
20th-century French male actors
21st-century French male actors
French male television actors